KCED (91.3 FM) is a radio station  broadcasting on an Alternative format. Licensed to Centralia, Washington, the station serves the Centralia-Chehalis area. The station is currently owned by Centralia College. The station is licensed for, and operating with, an effective radiated power of 1,000 watts.

References

External links

CED
Centralia, Washington
CED